Leonardo "Leo" Román Riquelme (born 6 July 2000) is a Spanish footballer who plays as a goalkeeper for RCD Mallorca.

Club career
Román was born in Ibiza, Balearic Islands, and represented UD Atlético Isleño, CF Sant Rafel and Atlètic Penya Blanc-i-Blava before joining SCR Peña Deportiva's youth setup in 2017. On 31 August 2018, after finishing his formation, he returned to Sant Rafel on loan for the season, being assigned to the main squad in the Tercera División.

Román made his senior debut on 3 November 2018, starting in a 1–2 away loss against UD Poblense. He returned to Peña in the following June, after playing 14 matches, and was assigned to the main squad in the Segunda División B.

On 6 August 2020, Román signed a four-year contract with RCD Mallorca and was initially assigned to the reserves also in the fourth division. He made his first-team debut on 16 December of the following year, starting in a 6–0 away routing of UD Llanera in the season's Copa del Rey.

Román's professional debut occurred on 5 January 2022, as he played the full 90 minutes in a 2–1 win at SD Eibar, also in the national cup. He made his La Liga debut three days later, starting in a 0–2 away loss against Levante UD.

On 12 July 2022, Román renewed his contract with the Bermellones until 2026.

Personal life
Román's father Vicente was also a footballer and a goalkeeper who later became a manager, while his older brother Alejandro also plays in the same position. His father also represented Peña Deportiva and managed both his sons at Sant Rafel.

References

External links
Profile at the RCD Mallorca website

2000 births
Living people
Footballers from Ibiza
Spanish footballers
Association football goalkeepers
La Liga players
Segunda División B players
Tercera División players
Tercera Federación players
SCR Peña Deportiva players
CF Sant Rafel players
RCD Mallorca B players
RCD Mallorca players
Spain under-21 international footballers